The 1939 International Lawn Tennis Challenge was the 34th edition of what is now known as the Davis Cup. 20 teams entered the Europe Zone, while 7 entered the America Zone.

Australia defeated Cuba in the North & Central America Zone final, and then received a walkover in the America Inter-Zonal final after Brazil, the only team in the South America Zone, withdrew. In the Europe Zone final Yugoslavia defeated Germany. In the Inter-Zonal play-off Australia defeated Yugoslavia, and then defeated the United States in the Challenge Round. The final was played at the Merion Cricket Club in Haverford, Pennsylvania, United States on 2–5 September.

America Zone

North & Central America Zone

Final
Cuba vs. Australia

Americas Inter-Zonal Final
Australia defeated Brazil by walkover.

Europe Zone

Draw

Final
Yugoslavia vs. Germany

Inter-Zonal Final
Australia vs. Yugoslavia

Challenge Round
United States vs. Australia

See also
 1939 Wightman Cup

Notes

References

External links
Davis Cup official website

Davis Cups by year
 
International Lawn Tennis Challenge
International Lawn Tennis Challenge
International Lawn Tennis Challenge